Ruralvale is an unincorporated community in Whitfield County, in the U.S. state of Georgia.

History
A variant spelling is "Rural Vale". A post office called Rural Vale was established in 1852, and remained in operation until 1908. The community was descriptively so named on account of its rural location.

Notable person
Malcolm C. Tarver, a U.S. Representative from Georgia from 1927 until 1947, was born at Ruralvale in 1885.

References

Unincorporated communities in Whitfield County, Georgia